Asekan or Askan or Eskan may refer to:
 Asekan, Alborz
 Eskan, Hamadan
 Eskan, Markazi
 Asekan, Sistan and Baluchestan